Chalcides minutus, or the small three-toed skink, is a species of skink found in Morocco and western Algeria. Its numbers are declining, but it is locally common. It is most often found in damp, sunny forests or grasslands with thick vegetation, but it can also be found in relatively dry areas, and its population is most likely decreasing. It is threatened by overgrazing and habitat destruction due to encroaching agricultural interests. Females of the species give birth to live young through ovoviviparity. Recent molecular studies have revealed that C. minutus could be a composite of species with individuals from the type locality forming long independent lineage and the remaining most closely related to Chalcides mertensi.

References

 Database entry includes a range map and justification for why this species is vulnerable

Chalcides
Reptiles of North Africa
Reptiles described in 1993
Taxa named by Vincenzo Caputo